The 2021 All-Ireland Senior Camogie Championship Final, the 90th event of its kind and the culmination of the 2021 All-Ireland Senior Camogie Championship, was played at Croke Park on 12 September 2021. Galway defeated Cork in the final to claim their 5th title.

Details

References

1
All-Ireland Senior Camogie Championship Finals
camogie
All-Ireland Senior Camogie Championship Final, 2021